The 1984 Fischer-Grand Prix was a men's tennis tournament played on indoor hard courts at the Wiener Stadthalle in Vienna, Austria that was part of the 1984 Volvo Grand Prix. It was the tenth edition of the tournament and was held from 22 October until 29 October 1984. Eighth-seeded Tim Wilkison won the singles title.

Finals

Singles

 Tim Wilkison defeated  Pavel Složil 6–1, 6–1, 6–2
 It was Wilkison's 1st title of the year and the 8th of his career.

Doubles

 Wojciech Fibak /  Sandy Mayer defeated  Heinz Günthardt /  Balázs Taróczy 6–4, 6–4
 It was Fibak's 4th title of the year and the 61st of his career. It was Mayer's 4th title of the year and the 34th of his career.

References

External links
 ATP tournament profile
 ITF tournament edition details

 
Fischer-Grand Prix
Vienna Open
1984 in Austrian tennis